Árpád Glatz (5 January 1939 – 5 December 2000) was a Hungarian basketball player. He competed in the men's tournament at the 1960 Summer Olympics and the 1964 Summer Olympics.

References

1939 births
2000 deaths
Hungarian men's basketball players
Olympic basketball players of Hungary
Basketball players at the 1960 Summer Olympics
Basketball players at the 1964 Summer Olympics
Basketball players from Budapest